Saddle Peak Hills Wilderness is the smallest designated wilderness area created by the California Desert Protection Act of 1994.

History
A 1980 Bureau of Land Management report recommended the area as unsuitable for wilderness designation, as the mineral resources identified in the study were likely to be commercially viable. These included copper, lead, silver and talc, all of which had been historically extracted in the area.

The area was given wilderness status on 21 October 1994.

Geology
The area contains considerable deposits of talc.

Ecology

Vegetation
Vegetation consists mostly of creosote bush and allscale scrubs. No sensitive or significant plant species are known to occur within the wilderness area.

Wildlife
The area is not known to support any listed, sensitive or rare species.

The sandy substrate in an area of approximately 3 square miles (1,920 acres / 7.8 square kilometres) provides habitat for the Mojave fringe-toed lizard, a highly adapted sand-dwelling species.

See also
 List of U.S. Wilderness Areas
 Wilderness Act

Notes

References

IUCN Category Ib
Protected areas established in 1994
Protected areas of California